The 2020 Eastern Washington Eagles football team represented Eastern Washington University as a member of the Big Sky Conference during the 2020–21 NCAA Division I FCS football season. Led by fourth-year head coach Aaron Best, the Eagles played their home games at Roos Field in Cheney, Washington.

Previous season

The Eagles finished the 2019 season with an overall record of 7–5 and 6–2 in Big Sky play to place in a three-way tie for third. They were not selected to participate in the FCS Playoffs.

Preseason

Polls
On July 23, 2020, during the virtual Big Sky Kickoff, the Eagles were predicted to finish fourth in the Big Sky by both the coaches and media.

Preseason All-Conference Team
The Eagles had two players selected to the Preseason All-Conference Team. Senior quarterback Eric Barriere was also selected as the Big Sky Preseason Most Valuable Player.

Eric Barriere – Sr. QB (Preseason Offensive MVP)

Tristen Taylor – Sr. OT

Schedule

Eastern Washington released their initial full schedule on January 11, 2019.

The Eagles were scheduled to play against Florida on September 5 in Gainesville, but this game was canceled on July 30 after the Southeastern Conference moved to a ten-game, conference-only schedule for its teams due to the COVID-19 pandemic.

On August 13, the Big Sky Conference canceled all fall sports, including football, and announced that these sports would begin competition in the Spring of 2021 due to the ongoing COVID-19 pandemic.

On November 4, the Big Sky Conference announced a six game, conference-only football schedule for participating programs that will begin in February. Due to this shortened season, previously scheduled games against Western Illinois, Northern Arizona, Southern Utah, Northern Colorado, and Weber State will not be rescheduled.

On January 15, 2021, Montana, Montana State, Northern Colorado, Portland State, and Sacramento State all opted out of the 2020 spring conference season. The Big Sky Conference announced on the same day that they will move forward with a six game conference season with the remaining eight teams that have not opted out of the spring season. On January 25, 2021, the Big Sky Conference announced its final spring football schedule.

Ranking movements

References

Eastern Washington
Eastern Washington Eagles football seasons
Eastern Washington
Eastern Washington Eagles football